This is a Bibliography of World War II memoirs and autobiographies. This list aims to include memoirs written by participants of World War II about their wartime experience, as well as larger autobiographies of participants of World War II that are at least partially concerned with the author's wartime experience. Works on this list should be all those primary accounts of World War II wartime experience intended for publication. The list does not aim to include diaries, private letter collections or transcripts of private conversations. It also should not include any prewar writings, setting the earliest dates of publication available for this list at 1937 (Second Sino-Japanese War), 1939 (European theater of World War II) and 1941 (Pacific War), depending on geographic context.

This article is part of the larger effort to document the Bibliography of World War II.

Individual memoirs of World War II that are notable enough to merit their own article are additionally collected in the World War II memoirs category and in the Holocaust personal accounts category.

Entries are listed primarily by the professional background, then secondarily by national background. The professional background is shown in the context of World War II and does not pay attention to prior or later assignment; for instance, Dwight D. Eisenhower is listed as a general, not as a political leader.

Bibliography

Civilians, victims of genocide and persecution

France

Hungary

Italy

Poland

United Kingdom

United States 

  — Victim of the Internment of Japanese Americans
  — Victim of the Internment of Japanese Americans

Civilians, other

Australia 

  — Australian woman's recollection about the presence of U.S. troops in Australia during the war

France

Germany

Japan

Singapore

Journalists; war correspondents

Australia

United Kingdom

Military, generals & admirals

Finland

France

Germany

Italy

Poland

Soviet Union

United Kingdom 

 
 
 
 
 

United States

Military, other

Australia 

 
  — Australian prisoner-of-war in German camps.
  — Australian prisoner-of-war in Japanese camps.
  — 9th Australian Division soldier in North Africa.
  — Australian anti-aircraft battery commander during the 1942 Battle of Rabaul of the 2/22nd Battalion.

Canada 

 
  — first-hand account by a Canadian veteran of the Hastings and Prince Edward Regiment

France 

  — French airman who later served in the Royal Air Force.

Germany

United Kingdom

United States

Political leaders; politicians; heads of state; diplomats

France

Germany

Hungary

Italy

Soviet Union

United Kingdom

United States

Secret agents; spies

See also 

 Bibliography of the Holocaust
 Bibliography of the Holocaust in Greece
 Bibliography of World War II
 Bibliography of World War II battles and campaigns in Europe, North Africa and the Middle East
 Bibliography of World War II battles and campaigns in East Asia, South East Asia and the Pacific
 Bibliography of World War II military units and formations
 Bibliography of World War II warships

Memoirs & Autobiographies
!Bibliography